Rhinoscapha biundulata is a species of true weevil family. It occurs in New Guinea.

References 

 Zipcodezoo
 Global species

biundulata
Entiminae
Beetles described in 1897